El Affroun is a district in Blida Province, Algeria. It was named after its capital, El Affroun.

Municipalities
The district is further divided into 2 municipalities:
El Affroun
Oued Djer

Districts of Blida Province